MyEarthDream is the sixth studio album by the Austrian Symphonic metal band Edenbridge. It is the first album by the band that was recorded with an orchestra, namely the Czech Film Orchestra. The music focuses on b-flat-tuned 7-string guitars and is darker and harder than the band's previous releases.

Reception

The German edition of Metal Hammer as well as the Sonic Seducer praised the quality of the production. The former noted the participation of Karl Groom and  Mika Jussila (Stratovarius, Avantasia) while the latter magazine called the MyEarthDream the most intense album that had so far been released by Edenbridge. About.com's reviewer wrote of "well crafted songs and good musicianship" and observed that the band was best when they stayed within the symphonic metal genre without drifting too far into power metal.

Track listing

Personnel

Band members
Sabine Edelsbacher - lead vocals
Arne "Lanvall" Stockhammer - lead, rhythm & acoustic guitars, keyboards & piano, bouzouki, pipa, producer
Frank Bindig - bass guitar, growls

Guest musicians
Sebastian Lanser - all drums on the album
Robby Valentine - backing vocals & choirs
Dennis Ward - backing vocals & choirs
Karl Groom - 3rd guitar solo on "Shadowplay"
Czech Film Orchestra conducted by Jaroslav Brych

Production
Orchestral score by Enrique Ugarte
Produced by Lanvall
Mixed by Karl Groom
Mastered by Mika Jussila
Cover design by Anthony Clarkson
Layout design by Thomas Ewerhard

References

2008 albums
Edenbridge (band) albums
Napalm Records albums